The 2022 Munster Senior Football Championship was the 2022 installment of the annual Munster Senior Football Championship organised by the Munster GAA. Kerry were defending champions and went on to retain the title after a 1-28 to 0-8 win against Limerick in the final on 28 May.

Teams
The Munster championship is contested by all six counties in the Irish province of Munster.

Draw
Cork and Kerry, finalists from the 2021 championship, received a bye to the semi-finals.

Bracket

Quarter-finals

Summary

Matches
The four non-finalists from the 2021 championship entered this round. The lowest ranked counties to play in the quarter-finals were Tipperary and Waterford of Division 4.

Semi-finals
The two finalists from the 2021 championship entered this round along with the two quarter-final winners.

Final

The winners advanced to the 2022 All-Ireland SFC quarter-finals, while the runners-up advanced to the qualifiers.

All-Ireland/Tailteann Cup qualification
{| class="wikitable" style="text-align:center"
!
! width="150" style="text-align:left;" |Team
!Championship
!Qualification Method
|- style="background:#ccffcc"
| 1|| align="left" | Kerry
| rowspan="4" |Qualification for the 2022 All-Ireland Senior Football Championship
|Via the Provincial Final
|- style="background:#ccffcc"
| 13|| align="left" | Clare
| rowspan="2" |Via the 2022 National Football League
|- style="background:#ccffcc"
| 14|| align="left" | Cork
|- style="background:#ccffcc"
| 16|| align="left" | Limerick
|Via the Provincial Final
|- 
! colspan="4" |
|- style="background:#FFFFE0"
| 24|| align="left" | Tipperary
| rowspan="2" |Qualification for the 2022 Tailteann Cup
| rowspan="2" |Via the 2022 National Football League
|- style="background:#FFFFE0"
| 32|| align="left" | Waterford
|}

References

2M
Munster Senior Football Championship